Massachusetts Route 71 and New York State Route 71 (NY 71) are adjoining state highways in the states of Massachusetts and New York in the United States. The two highways form a continuous roadway connecting NY 22 in Hillsdale, Columbia County, New York, to Route 23 and Route 41 in Great Barrington, Berkshire County, Massachusetts. Both routes are part of the Henry Knox Trail.

The New York half of the highway was rebuilt by the state in the late 1920s and designated as NY 71 as part of the 1930 renumbering of state highways in New York. Its Massachusetts continuation was unnumbered until the early 1930s when it was assigned Route 69. Around the end of the decade, Route 69 was renumbered to Route 71 to match the New York number. At  in length, NY 71 is the shortest two-digit state highway in New York.

Route description

The two-state highway begins as NY 71 at a Y intersection with NY 22 in Green River, a hamlet within the town of Hillsdale in Columbia County, New York. Both legs of the junction are two-lane, two-way roads; however, only the southern leg is officially designated as part of NY 71. The north leg is also state-maintained but designated as NY 980E, an unsigned reference route. NY 71 heads southeastward from the Y intersection as a two-lane road named Nobletown Road, following the Green River through a narrow valley in the Taconic Mountains. It passes several homes in an otherwise wooded area on its way to the Massachusetts state line, from which the roadway continues as that state's Route 71. Now in the town of Alford in Berkshire County, Massachusetts, Route 71 changes names to Green River Valley Road, continuing through residential areas in the base of the river valley. The valley and the road curve slightly southward near the Egremont town line, at which point the level of development along the highway begins to slowly taper off.

Across the town line, Route 71 changes names to Egremont Plain Road. It continues alongside the Green River to North Egremont, an unincorporated village comprising a small cluster of homes around Route 71's junction with Boice and Prospect Lake roads. In the center of the community, the highway passes along the east side of the National Register of Historic Places-listed North Egremont Historic District. Outside of the village, Route 71 bends back to the southeast, proceeding through another rural stretch to reach the residential village of Egremont Plain. Near the center of the community, the highway crosses into the town of Great Barrington and passes south of Walter J. Koladza Airport.

History

In mid-1928, the state of New York awarded a contract worth $139,262 (equivalent to $ in ) to improve the New York portion of the Green River–Great Barrington highway to state highway standards. Work on the highway was completed by the following year. At the state line, the road connected to an unimproved road leading southeast through North Egremont to Great Barrington. The state of Massachusetts had planned to reconstruct the road after work on its continuation into New York was completed; however, the New York state line–Great Barrington highway remained unimproved through the end of the decade. In the 1930 renumbering of state highways in New York, the section of the Green River–Great Barrington highway in New York was designated as NY 71. Its Massachusetts continuation became Route 69 ; it was subsequently renumbered in 1939 to Route 71 to match the New York designation.

Major intersections

See also

References

External links

Massachusetts Route 71 endpoint photos
Neilbert.com Massachusetts Route Log
Massachusetts Route 71 on Alps' Roads

071
071
Transportation in Columbia County, New York
Transportation in Berkshire County, Massachusetts